NSIS may refer to:

Technology
 National Sheep Identification System, the implementation in Ireland for the identification and registration of ovine and caprine animals
 Network Store Interface Service, a Microsoft Windows service
 Next Steps in Signaling, a former Internet Engineering Task Force working group
 Nullsoft Scriptable Install System, a script-driven Windows installation system

Other uses
 National Security Intelligence Section, of Ireland's Directorate of Military Intelligence
 New Sathorn International School, an international school located in Bangkok, Thailand